Masahiko Otsue (born 14 October 1946) is a Japanese alpine skier. He competed in two events at the 1972 Winter Olympics.

References

1946 births
Living people
Japanese male alpine skiers
Olympic alpine skiers of Japan
Alpine skiers at the 1972 Winter Olympics
Sportspeople from Tottori Prefecture
20th-century Japanese people